Johannes „Jan“ Laurentius Augustinus Peutz (24 March 1886 – 20 December 1957) was a Dutch internist. In 1921 he published a case report on a form of polyposis and pigmentation which was later named Peutz–Jeghers syndrome.

References

1886 births
1957 deaths
Dutch internists